Universal set may refer to:

Mathematics
Universal set, the set of all objects, an object whose existence conflicts with the axioms of standard set theory but may exist in other variants
Universe (mathematics), the proper class of all objects in a domain of discourse
Universal point set, in graph drawing, a set that can be used for the vertices of drawings of all n-vertex planar graphs
Sample space, in probability theory and statistics, the set of all possible outcomes of an observation or experiment

Other
Universal Character Set, a set of nearly 100,000 characters on which many character encodings are based